Tallinna Hipodroom is a harness racing track in Tallinn, Estonia. The track is located in the eastern part of the city at the Põhja-Tallinn district. It was established in 1923. Racing events were held on every other Saturday.

Gallery

References

External links 

Sports venues in Tallinn
Horse racing venues in Estonia
1923 establishments in Estonia